Dilshod is a Persian (دلشاد, Delshad) male given name that may refer to

Dilshod Zikiryokhojaev (born 1949) Tajikistani surgeon.
Dilshod Aripov (born 1977), Uzbekistani Greco-Roman wrestler
Dilshod Choriev (born 1985), Uzbekistani judoka
Dilshod Juraev (born 1992), Uzbekistani footballer
Dilshod Mahmudov (born 1982), Uzbekistani boxer 
Dilshod Mansurov (born 1983), Uzbekistani freestyle wrestler 
Dilshod Mukhtarov (born 1975), Uzbekistani sport shooter
Dilshod Nazarov (born 1982), Tajikistani hammer thrower
Dilshod Rakhmatullaev (born 1989), Uzbekistani football midfielder
Dilshod Sharofetdinov (born 1985), Uzbekistani footballer 
Dilshod Vasiev (born 1988), Tajikistani football midfielder
Dilshod Yarbekov (born 1974), Uzbekistani boxer
Dilshod Niyazov
Dilshodbek Ruzmetov

Persian given names
Uzbekistani given names
Tajikistani given names